Ronn McMahon (born May 29, 1965) is a former Canadian national men's basketball team player, but he was in fact born in Provo, Utah in the United States. While playing in college at Eastern Washington University, McMahon 

A point guard, McMahon ended his collegiate career with Eastern Washington University men's basketball's second best steals getter, with a 3.52 average per game, 225 over his 3-year career, an average that trails only Mookie Blaylock's 3.8.  McMahon's nine steals during a December 15, 1988 game against Portland State is his school's all-time record. He was named to the Big Sky all-conference first-team for 1989–90.

McMahon was Canada's starting point guard at the 1994 FIBA World Championship as well as the 1992 FIBA Tournament of the Americas.  They finished 7th and 5th respectively in these tournaments.

He played professionally in 1991–92 with the Yakima Sun Kings of the Continental Basketball Association. Born in Provo, Utah, McMahon now lives in Tacoma, Washington with his family and works for the YMCA.

References

1965 births
Living people
Canadian expatriate basketball people in the United States
Canadian men's basketball players
Chicago Rockers players
Eastern Washington Eagles men's basketball players
Salt Lake Bruins men's basketball players
Sportspeople from Provo, Utah
Point guards
Basketball players from Tacoma, Washington
Yakima Sun Kings players
1994 FIBA World Championship players